Costosa rhodantha is a moth of the family Tortricidae first described by Edward Meyrick in 1907. It is found in Sri Lanka.

References

Moths of Asia
Moths described in 1907